Andreas Linden (born 20 February 1965) is a retired male javelin thrower from Germany. He set his personal best (85.42 metres) on 17 September 1995 in Mülheim-Kärlich.

Achievements

References

1965 births
Living people
German male javelin throwers
Place of birth missing (living people)
West German male javelin throwers
World Athletics Championships athletes for West Germany
World Athletics Championships athletes for Germany